George Washington Foster, Jr. (December 18, 1866 – December 20, 1923), was an American architect. He was among the first African-American architects licensed by the State of New Jersey in 1908, and later New York (1916). Foster partnered with Vertner Woodson Tandy (1885–1949), the first African-American architect licensed by the State of New York, in the firm of Tandy and Foster, which was active from 1908 to 1914.

Early life
George Washington Foster, Jr. was born on December 18, 1866, in Virginia. His father was a carriage stripper and his mother was a descendant of Jefferson Davis. He moved to Newark, New Jersey at the age of four.

Foster attended night school at Cooper Union and studied architecture.

Career
Foster is said to have worked in the office of Henry Hardenbergh from 1888 to 1889, who designed the New York City landmarks Dakota Apartment Building, Plaza Hotel, and the first Waldorf-Astoria, on the present site of the Empire State Building. During his time with Hardenbergh, he would have worked on the Waldorf Hotel in 1892. He may also have worked on the Flatiron Building, designed by the Chicago-based firm of D. H. Burnham.

Around 1908, Foster met Vertner Woodson Tandy, New York's first registered African-American architect and formed the architectural firm Tandy & Foster together. Tandy & Foster designed St. Philip's Episcopal Church (Harlem, New York) in 1910. After 1915, Foster was licensed to practice in New York and maintained his own office until his death. They also worked on the Mother AME Zion Church in Harlem.

Personal life
He relocated with his wife, Carrie, to Park Ridge, New Jersey in a house he designed and built. He and his wife had six children, including Henry Hardenburg Foster, who was named after his employer.

He died on December 20, 1923, in a house he designed on Colony Avenue, in Bergen County, Park Ridge, New Jersey. He is buried at the Westwood Cemetery in Westwood, New Jersey.

He is the great-grandfather of Chuck D, rap artist from Public Enemy and Prophets of Rage.

See also 

 African-American architects

References

1866 births
1923 deaths
Artists from Newark, New Jersey
People from Virginia
Architects from Virginia
African-American architects
American ecclesiastical architects
20th-century African-American people